Four ships of the Royal Navy have borne the name HMS Hinchinbrook.

  was a 10-gun sloop launched in 1744 that the French captured in 1746.
  was a 14-gun brig, previously named Britannia and then the privateer American Tartar. The Royal Navy captured her in 1777, used her as a slop ship from 1780 and sold her in 1783. She then became the mercantile , which primarily served as a Greenland whaler until two French frigates captured and burnt her in 1806.
  was a 12-gun sloop in service in 1778 that the Americans captured that year at the Frederica naval action.
  was a 28-gun sixth rate, previously the French merchant vessel Astree. She was captured in 1778 and foundered in 1782, but with no loss of life.

Notes

Royal Navy ship names